The Speaker of the West Virginia House of Delegates is the presiding officer of the House of Delegates in West Virginia. Since West Virginia's founding in 1863, the following persons have served as Speaker:

Speakers of the House of Delegates under the Constitution of West Virginia

See also 
West Virginia Legislature
West Virginia House of Delegates

References

Government of West Virginia
S
 
West Virginia